Periodon is a genus of conodonts which existed in what is now Canada, Iran, Argentina, China, Russia, and the United States during the Ordovician Period. It was described by Hadding in 1913, and the type species is P. aculeatus.

Species
 Periodon flabellum Lindström, 1954
 Periodon zgierzensis Dzik, 1976
 Periodon aculeatus Hadding, 1913
 Periodon selenopsis Serpagli, 1974
 Periodon macrodentatus (Graves & Ellison 1941)
 Periodon hankensis Svend Stouge, 2012

References

External links 
 Periodon at the Paleobiology Database

Conodont genera
Paleozoic life of the Northwest Territories